Crisp Glacier is a glacier between Killer Ridge and Second Facet, flowing southeast into Debenham Glacier in Victoria Land. It was named by the Advisory Committee on Antarctic Names for Kelton W. Crisp, U.S. Navy, who was in charge of the electric shop at McMurdo Station, 1962.

References
 

Glaciers of Scott Coast